Neocrepidodera obirensis is a species of flea beetle from Chrysomelidae family that can be found in Austria and Slovenia.

References

Beetles described in 1897
Beetles of Europe
obirensis